These are the official results of the men's triple jump event at the 1983 IAAF World Championships in Helsinki, Finland. There were a total of 27 participating athletes, with two qualifying groups and the final held on 8 August 1983.

Medalists

Schedule
All times are Eastern European Time (UTC+2)

Records

Final

Qualifying round
Held on Sunday 1983-08-07 with the mark set at 16.50 metres

See also
 1980 Men's Olympic Triple Jump (Moscow)
 1982 Men's European Championships Triple Jump (Athens)
 1984 Men's Olympic Triple Jump (Los Angeles)
 1986 Men's European Championships Triple Jump (Stuttgart)

References
 Results

T
Triple jump at the World Athletics Championships